Big Wheel and Others is the seventh full-length album by American musician Cass McCombs. It was released on October 15, 2013.

Track listing

Personnel 
Adapted from AllMusic.
 Cass McCombs – guitars, vocals
 Karen Black – featured artist
 Tim Cedar – engineer
 arthur Elletson – engineer
 Sean Paulson – engineer
 Ariel Rechtshaid – engineer
 Nicolas Vernhes – engineer
 Gabe Wax – engineer
 J.R. White – mixing
 Malcolm Pullinger – editing
 Mike Gordon – bass ("There Can Be Only One")
 Chris Lux – titles
 Perry Lubin – layout
 Joe Lambert – mastering
 Albert Herter – cover art, drawing

References

2013 albums
Cass McCombs albums